Tarrer Inn is a historic hotel in Colquitt, Georgia.  It was built as a residence in 
1861, burned in a 1902 fire, and was rebuilt with brick. It opened as a hotel in 1915.

The hotel was renovated during 1992–1994. It has 12 guest rooms decorated with antiques and hand-painted fireplace mantels. It also has a restaurant serving Southern cuisine.

References

Buildings and structures in Miller County, Georgia
Hotels in Georgia (U.S. state)
Historic sites in Georgia (U.S. state)